is a former baseball player from Japan. Asai played in the Nippon baseball league. He initially played in the Pioneer League before moving on to the Hiroshima Toyo Carp in the Central League. At times he played as a pinch hitter.

References

1971 births
Living people
Baseball people from Toyama Prefecture
Japanese baseball players
Nippon Professional Baseball infielders
Hiroshima Toyo Carp players
Japanese baseball coaches
Nippon Professional Baseball coaches